Sofia Kenin defeated Garbiñe Muguruza in the final, 4–6, 6–2, 6–2 to win the women's singles tennis title at the 2020 Australian Open. It was her first major title. Kenin was the youngest Australian Open finalist since Ana Ivanovic and the youngest champion since Maria Sharapova, both in 2008. This was the first Australian Open final in the Open Era to be contested between two players ranked outside the top ten, and the first such major final since the 2018 US Open. Kenin entered the top 10 in rankings for the first time by winning the title.

Naomi Osaka was the defending champion, but lost to Coco Gauff in the third round.

This was the final professional tournament for two former world No. 1's. The first was 2018 champion Caroline Wozniacki, who lost in the third round to Ons Jabeur. The second was five-time major champion and 2008 champion Maria Sharapova, who lost to Donna Vekić in the first round.

The elimination of Angelique Kerber in the fourth round guaranteed a first-time Australian Open champion for the third year in a row. Jabeur became the first Arabian woman to reach the quarterfinals of a major, as well as the first African woman to reach the quarterfinals of a major since Amanda Coetzer at the 2001 Australian Open. Anett Kontaveit became the first Estonian to reach an Australian Open quarterfinal, and the second to do so at any major after Kaia Kanepi. She lost there to Simona Halep in straight sets. Ashleigh Barty became the first Australian to reach the semifinals since Wendy Turnbull in 1984. Barty's quarterfinal win over Petra Kvitová was her first top ten singles win at a major, having lost her five previous such matches.

Seeds
Seeding per WTA rankings.

Draw

Finals

Top half

Section 1

Section 2

Section 3

Section 4

Bottom half

Section 5

Section 6

Section 7

Section 8

Seeded players
The following are the seeded players. Seedings are based on WTA rankings on 13 January 2020, while ranking and points before are as of 20 January 2020. Points after are as of 3 February 2020.  Because the 2020 tournament takes place one week later than in 2019, points defending includes results from both the 2019 Australian Open and the tournaments from the week of 28 January 2019 (St. Petersburg and Hua Hin).

† The player did not qualify for the tournament in 2019, but was defending points from an ITF tournament (Launceston).

Withdrawn players
The following player would have been seeded, but she withdrew from the event.

Other entry information

Wild cards

Protected ranking

Qualifiers

Withdrawals

 – not included on entry list& – withdrew from entry list

Championship match statistics

Notes

References

External links
Draw information
 2020 Australian Open – Women's draws and results at the International Tennis Federation

Women's Singles
2020
2020 in Australian women's sport
2020 WTA Tour
2020 in women's tennis